The  is a dual-voltage electric multiple unit (EMU) train type operated by West Japan Railway Company (JR-West) on limited express services in Japan since 2001.

Variants

683-0 series 
The first subseries consists of 54 cars composed of 6 6-car trains (W31–W36) and 6 3-car trains (V31–V36) built in 2001–2002.

683-2000 series 
87 cars were built in 3-car and 5-car sets. This subseries was subsequently transferred to the 289 series with their AC equipment removed. The move was made after the opening of the Hokuriku Shinkansen and the associated discontinuation of service by these sets on the Hokuhoku Line.

683-4000 series 
108 cars were built in 9-car sets for a total of 12 trainsets.

683-8000 series 
This is the designation given to a 6-car train (N03) and a 3-car train (N13) formerly owned by Hokuetsu Express for services on the Hakutaka limited express. At the opening of the Hokuriku Shinkansen in March 2015, the sets were transferred to JR West.

Operations

JR-West
 Thunderbird
 Shirasagi
 Biwako Express
 Ohayō Express
 Oyasumi Express
 Dinostar (from 14 March 2015)
 Noto Kagaribi (from 14 March 2015)
 Kuroshio (from 13 March 2015)

Hokuetsu Express
 Hakutaka (until 12 March 2015)

JR Central
 Home Liner Ōgaki rapid service (until 13 March 2015)
 Home Liner Sekigahara rapid service (until 13 March 2015)

Formations
The various formations are configured as follows.

3-car sets

Thunderbird sets

Shirasagi sets

The KuHa 682 cars are each fitted with one scissors-type pantograph.

5-car sets

Shirasagi sets

The SaHa 682 and KuRo 682 cars are each fitted with one scissors-type pantograph.

6-car sets

Thunderbird sets

The SaHa 682 cars are each fitted with one scissors-type pantograph.

9-car sets

Thunderbird sets

The SaHa 682 cars are each fitted with one single-arm pantograph.

Interior

Refurbishment

All of the 683 series trainsets used on Thunderbird limited express services are scheduled to undergo a programme of refurbishment from autumn 2015 until the end of fiscal 2018. The first set treated, nine-car 683-4000 series set T51, was returned to revenue service in September 2015.

Conversion to 289 series

From 2015, 85 former Shirasagi 683 series vehicles were converted and reformed to become DC-only 289 series EMUs, formed as three-car, four-car, and six-car sets for use on Hashidate, Kinosaki, Kounotori, and Kurioshio limited express services in the Kyoto and Osaka area.

References

 
 
 

Electric multiple units of Japan
West Japan Railway Company
Hitachi multiple units
Train-related introductions in 2001
20 kV AC multiple units
Kawasaki multiple units
1500 V DC multiple units of Japan
Kinki Sharyo multiple units